Caterina Gabrielli (12 November 1730 – 16 February or 16 April 1796), born Caterina Fatta, was an Italian coloratura singer. She was the most important soprano of her age. A woman of great personal charm and dynamism, Charles Burney referred to her as "the most intelligent and best-bred virtuosa" that he had ever encountered. The excellence of her vocal artistry is reflected in the fact that she was able to secure long-term engagements in three of the most prestigious operatic centers in her day outside of Italy (Vienna, St. Petersburg, and London).

Biography
Caterina Gabrielli was the daughter of a cook in the service of prince Gabrielli, in Rome. With the support of the prince, she studied with García and Porpora and at the L'Ospedaletto conservatory in Venice, and as a sign of gratitude she decided to assume her patron's surname as her stage name. Her humble roots were remembered by audiences in her nickname La cochetta ("little cook"), which was actually recorded in the librettos published for her early appearances at the Teatro San Moisè in Venice during the 1754–55 operatic season.

In 1747 she sang at the theater of Lucca in Sofonisba by Baldassare Galuppi and in 1750 she appeared in Niccolò Jommelli's Didone. Her first distinguished season of singing was in Venice in 1754–55. She was then hired by the imperial court of Vienna and sang in a series of dramatic works of various types written by Christoph Willibald von Gluck: La danza (1755), Le cinesi (1755), L'innocenza giustificata (1755), and Il re pastore (1756). She also appeared in two sacred works of Georg Christoph Wagenseil: Gioas re ti Giuda (1755) and Il roveto di Mosè (1756). She flourished in Italy for the remainder of the 1750s, notably appearing in the world premieres of Pasquale Errichelli's Siroe (1758, Emira) and Gaetano Latilla's Ezio (1758, Fulvia).

In 1760 Gabrielli returned to Vienna to appears in Gluck's Tetide, Giuseppe Scarlatti's Issipile, and Johann Adolf Hasse's Alciade al Bivio. A second return to Italy brought even greater prestige. In 1767, she created the role of Argene in Josef Mysliveček's opera Il Bellerofonte at the Teatro San Carlo in Naples, thereby helping the composer break through to the upper echelon of operatic masters in Italy. In the period 1772–75, she was employed at the imperial court of St. Petersburg with Francesca Gabrielli. She appeared in Tommaso Traetta's operas Antigona (1772), Amore e Psiche (1773) and Lucio Vero (1774). She also sang several aria concerts with orchestral accompaniment at the court. In 1775 she moved to London because the director of imperial theaters in St. Petersburg was unwilling to pay what her future employers in London had promised.

During her last period of activity in Italy, in the title role of Mysliveček's Armida, performed in Milan during carnival of 1780 as one of the earliest operas produced at La Scala, she was forced to interrupt her performances in order to give birth to a baby daughter, the identity of whose father remains unknown. She also suffered the indignities of having to substitute arias by Giuseppe Sarti for the ones provided for her by Mysliveček and being taunted for her age by the Milanese audience. Although Gabrielli and Mysliveček were close artistic collaborators at times, there is no documentation to support reports that they were romantically involved; the earliest mention of a love affair with Mysliveček is found in the fifth edition of the Grove Dictionary of Music and Musicians (1954). She was actually closer to the composer Traetta, who was probably responsible for having her brought to St. Petersburg.

After her last known operatic appearances in Venice in 1782, she retired to Bologna, where she died in 1796.

The singer Francesca Gabrielli (born ca. 1735) was probably her sister. She frequently traveled with Caterina and sometimes appeared in lesser roles in the same operas that featured her as prima donna.

Operatic roles
Sofonisba by Baldassare Galuppi (Lucca, 1747)
Didone by Niccolò Jommelli (Naples, 1750)
Ermione in Antigona by Baldassare Galuppi (Venice, 1754)
Ermione in Astianatte by Antonio Gaetano Pampani (Venice, 1755)
Emira in Solimano by Domenico Fischietti (Venice, 1755)
Lisinga in L’eroe cinese by Gaetano Piazza (Milan, 1758)
Ipermestra in Ipermestra by Baldassare Galuppi (Milan, 1758)
Fulvia in Ezio by Gaetano Latilla (Naples, 1758)
Beroe in the pasticcio Nitteti (Genoa, 1758)
Dircea in Demofoonte by Baldassare Galuppi (Padua, 1758)
Cleofide in an anonymous Alessandro nell’Indie (Milan, 1759)
Dircea in Demofoonte by Antonio Ferradini (Milan, 1759)
Aricia in Ippolito ed Aricia by Tommaso Traetta (Parma, 1759)
Vitellia in La clemenza di Tito by Baldassare Galuppi (Turin, 1760)
Lavinia in Enea nel Lazio by Tommaso Traetta (Turin, 1760)
Telaire in I tindaridi by Tommaso Traetta (Parma, 1760)
Cleonice in an anonymous Demetrio (Padua, 1761)
Zenobia in an anonymous Zenobia (Lucca, 1761)
Cleonice in Demetrio by Giuseppe Ponzo (Turin, 1762)
Ifigenia in Ifigenia in Aulide by Ferdinando Bertoni (Turin, 1762)
Cleofide in Alessandro nell’Indie by Tommaso Traetta (Reggio Emilia, 1762)
Fulvia in Ezio by Giuseppe Scarlatti (Lucca, 1762)
Emirena in Adriano in Siria by Giuseppe Colla (Milan, 1763)
Didone in Didone abbandonata by Tommaso Traetta (Milan, 1763)
Aristea in L’olimpiade by Pietro Guglielmi (Naples, 1763)
Issipile in the pasticcio Issipile (Naples, 1763)
Berenice in Lucio Vero by Antonio Sacchini (Naples, 1764)
Marzia in Catone in Utica by Johann Christian Bach (Naples, 1764)
Marzia in Cajo Mario by Niccolò Piccinni (Naples, 1765)
Climene in Il grand Cid by Niccolò Piccinni (Naples, 1766)
Berenice in Lucio Vero by Antonio Sacchini (Naples, 1766)
Argene in Il Bellerofonte by Josef Mysliveček (Naples, 1767)
Clelia in Il trionfo di Clelia by Josef Mysliveček (Turin, 1768)
Ariene in Creso by Pasquale Cafaro (Turin, 1768)
Dircea in Demofoonte by Baldassare Galuppi (Palermo, 1768)
Berenice in the pasticcio Antigono (Palermo, 1769)
Aristea in the anonymous L’olimpiade (Palermo, 1770)
Cleonice in the pasticcio Demetrio (Palermo, 1770)
Antigona in Antigona by Tommaso Traetta (St. Petersburg, 1772)
Psiche in Amore e Psiche by Tommaso Traetta (St. Petersburg, 1773)
Berenice in Lucio Vero  by Tommaso Traetta (St. Petersburg, 1774)
Armida in the anonymous Armida (Lucca, 1778)
Armida in Armida by Josef Mysliveček (Milan, 1780)
Beroe in La Nitteti by Pasquale Anfossi (Venice, 1780)
Semiri in Arbace by Giovanni Battista Borghi (Venice, 1782)
Semira in Zemira by Pasquale Anfossi (Venice, 1782)

Source:  Claudio Sartori.  I libretti italiani a stampa dalle origini al 1800.  Cuneo, 1992-1994.

References

Article "Caterina Gabrielli" by Gerhard Croll in The New Grove Dictionary of Opera (1992).

1730 births
1796 deaths
18th-century Italian women opera singers
18th-century women opera singers from the Russian Empire
Italian operatic sopranos
Pupils of Metastasio
Singers from Rome